Edgar J. Schoen (Brooklyn, NY, August 10, 1925 – August 23, 2016) was an American physician who worked as a pediatric endocrinologist at Kaiser Permanente Medical Center in Oakland, California until 2003, and Clinical Professor in Pediatrics at the University of California, San Francisco until 2004. He held the position of Chair of the 1988 American Academy of Pediatrics Task Force on Circumcision.

Career 
Schoen held positions at Children's Hospital of the East Bay in Oakland, CA, and the University of California Medical Center in San Francisco, CA and was Board-certified in Pediatrics and Pediatric Endocrinology. He practiced Pediatrics and Pediatric Endocrinology in Oakland, CA for 46 years. Schoen was Chief of Pediatrics at Kaiser Permanente in Oakland for 24 years.

Circumcision
Schoen maintained Medicirc.org, an online resource in which he discussed what he perceived as the benefits of circumcision. It went offline at the end of 2012. Interviewed in the Eastbay Express (2000), he stated, "Circumcision is one of the best health insurance policies you can give a son. A circumcised boy has a lifetime advantage over an uncircumcised one."

Schoen has written about circumcision in the books Ed Schoen, MD on Circumcision and Circumcision, Sex, God, and Science: Modern Health Benefits of an Ancient Ritual as well as poetry on the topic in the American Journal of Diseases in Children.

In a Boston Globe article, Schoen said, concerning the AAP's decision to not advocate circumcision, "It's highly biased". The 1989 report he oversaw stated that circumcision reduced the risks of urinary tract infections and sexually transmitted diseases.

References

External links
Archive of Medicirc.org

1925 births
2016 deaths
American pediatric endocrinologists
Circumcision debate